Dhundh (ढुन्ढ) is a Hindu ritual in Rajasthan. It is performed on all children below one year old on Holi. This ritual may be similar to Punyajanam which the Tamils perform for the naming ceremony of a newborn.

History

This ritual is linked to the Bhavishya Purana which describes an incident involving a rakshasi demon named Dhundh during the reign of King Raghu. Abiding to Guru Vashishtha, people kindled fire at various spots to keep the demoness away. Thus the Lord's name and fire kept the demoness away. So on this day, children make mischief.

Ceremony

In the evening, people (called Gerias) come to the child's paternal home. The child is dressed into new clothes and is placed in the lap of relatives on the Bajotia (a wooden seat). Then Gerias dance around the child and beat on a cloth used to cover the child. Finally, the child's family gives sweets to the Gerias.

References

External links 
 Hinduism

Rajasthani culture
Hindu traditions